Euroman is a monthly men's lifestyle and fashion magazine headquartered in Copenhagen, Denmark. Its subtitle is the Only Original Magazine for Danish Men.

History and profile
Euroman was established in 1992. The founders are Morten and Peter Linck. Later they started another magazine, Eurowoman. In 2000, both magazines were acquired by the Egmont Publishing A/S. The company is owner and publisher of the magazine. It is published on a monthly basis. The headquarters is in Copenhagen. 

The publisher describes the target audience of the magazine as "modern and quality conscious men." The magazine targets men aged between 20 and 39 who have a high level education and above average income, and covers articles on lifestyle and fashion of men. It also features interviews with famous men and celebrities.

Kasper Steenbach served as the editor-in-chief of Euroman until August 2015 when he resigned from the post. In 2012, the magazine received the print merit award by the Society of Publication Designers.

In February 2007, the circulation of Euroman was 23,240 copies.

References

External links
 

1992 establishments in Denmark
Danish-language magazines
Lifestyle magazines
Magazines established in 1992
Magazines published in Copenhagen
Men's magazines
Men's fashion magazines
Monthly magazines published in Denmark